Stephen Robert Furness (December 5, 1950 – February 9, 2000) was an American defensive tackle for the Pittsburgh Steelers and Detroit Lions of the National Football League (NFL), and a member of the Steelers' famed Steel Curtain defense. He earned four Super Bowl rings as a professional player and ranks 23rd on the Steelers' all-time sack list. He was of English and Armenian descent.

Furness grew up in Warwick, Rhode Island, where he attended Bishop Hendricken High School before accepting a football scholarship to the University of Rhode Island. In addition to being a star football player for URI, he excelled at the hammer throw and turned down an invitation to the 1972 Olympic Trials to attend the Steelers' training camp. Furness was selected in the fifth round of the 1972 NFL Draft and initially served as a backup to Joe Greene and Ernie Holmes before replacing Holmes as defensive tackle in 1977. He started in Super Bowl XIII and was primarily known for his skills as a pass rusher, leading the team in quarterback sacks during several seasons with the Steelers. He collected 32 sacks over the course of his Steelers career. He was also an avid weight lifter and placed fourth in the 1980 'Strongest Man in Football' competition, which aired on CBS.

Furness was released by Pittsburgh after playing all 16 games in the 1980 season and he ended his playing career in 1981 with the Detroit Lions. After retiring from the NFL he became the defensive line coach for Michigan State from 1982 to 1990, where he worked under his former Steelers defensive coordinator George Perles and helped lead the team to two Big 10 Conference titles, a victory in the 1988 Rose Bowl and appearances in five additional bowl games. During this period he earned a master's degree in Athletic Administration from Michigan State University and was inducted to the University of Rhode Island Athletic Hall of Fame in 1987. He rejoined the NFL in 1991 as an assistant coach for the Indianapolis Colts before returning to the Steelers for his final two years as a defensive line coach (1992–1993). In 1999, he was named as one of the "50 Greatest Rhode Island Sports Figures" of the 20th Century by Sports Illustrated magazine, earning the 14th spot on the list.

Furness died unexpectedly of a heart attack on February 9, 2000. His son Zack Furness is a professor at Penn State University.

References

External links
"50 Greatest Rhode Island Sports Figures," Sports Illustrated, December 7, 1999, accessed 3/31/08
University of Rhode Island Official Athletic Site
Statistics at databasefootball.com
Death notice, infoplease.com
Souls who enriched our lives, our region, Pittsburgh Tribune-Review, Dec. 1, 2002, accessed 12/07/2006
Zack Furness, "My Dad Kicked Ass For a Living," Bad Subjects, Issue #57, October, 2001, accessed 3/31/08

1950 births
2000 deaths
Bishop Hendricken High School alumni
Sportspeople from Warwick, Rhode Island
University of Rhode Island alumni
American football defensive tackles
Pittsburgh Steelers players
Detroit Lions players
Indianapolis Colts coaches
Michigan State Spartans football coaches
Pittsburgh Steelers coaches
American people of Armenian descent
American people of English descent
Players of American football from Providence, Rhode Island
Rhode Island Rams football players
Sportspeople from Providence, Rhode Island